The 1840 Ohio gubernatorial election was held on October 13, 1840.

Incumbent Democratic Governor Wilson Shannon was defeated by Whig nominee, former U.S. Representative Thomas Corwin.

General election

Results

References

1840
Ohio
Gubernatorial